This is a list of chemotherapeutic agents, also known as cytotoxic agents or cytostatic drugs, that are known to be of use in chemotherapy for cancer.  This list is organized by type of agent, although the subsections are not necessarily definitive and are subject to revision. Each drug is listed once (at present), though it might fall in more than one subsection. A full alphabetical listing is included after the categorical listing.

The agents in this list are often combined into chemotherapy agent for polychemotherapy (combination chemotherapy). For example, the CHOP regimen consists of cyclophosphamide, doxorubicin, vincristine and prednisone.

Besides chemotherapy, medical oncology (pharmacotherapy for cancer) includes several noncytotoxic classes of therapy, such as hormonal therapy and targeted therapy (biologic therapy). Those agents are described in the relevant articles.

Alkylating agents

 Altretamine
 Bendamustine
 Busulfan
 Carboquone
 Carmustine
 Chlorambucil
 Chlormethine
 Chlorozotocin
 Cyclophosphamide
 Dacarbazine
 Fotemustine
 Ifosfamide
 Lomustine
 Melphalan
 Melphalan flufenamide
 Mitobronitol
 Nimustine
 Nitrosoureas
 Pipobroman
 Ranimustine
 Semustine
 Streptozotocin
 Temozolomide
 Thiotepa
 Treosulfan
 Triaziquone
 Triethylenemelamine
 Trofosfamide
 Uramustine

Anthracyclines

Aclarubicin
 Daunorubicin
 Doxorubicin
 Epirubicin
 Idarubicin
 Mitoxantrone
 Pirarubicin
 Valrubicin
 Zorubicin

Cytoskeletal disruptors (taxanes)

 Abraxane
 Cabazitaxel
 Docetaxel
 Larotaxel
 Paclitaxel
 Taxotere
 Tesetaxel

Epothilones

 Ixabepilone

Histone deacetylase inhibitors
 Vorinostat
 Romidepsin

Inhibitors of topoisomerase I

 Belotecan
 Camptothecin
 Exatecan
 Gimatecan
 Irinotecan
 Topotecan

Inhibitors of topoisomerase II

 Etoposide
 Teniposide
 Tafluposide

Kinase inhibitors

 Bortezomib
 Erlotinib
 Gefitinib
 Imatinib
 Vemurafenib
 Vismodegib

Nucleotide analogs and precursor analogs
 Azacitidine
 Azathioprine
 Capecitabine
 Cytarabine
 Doxifluridine
 Fluorouracil
 Gemcitabine
 Hydroxyurea
 Mercaptopurine
 Methotrexate
 Tioguanine (formerly Thioguanine)

Peptide antibiotics

 Actinomycin
 Bleomycin

Platinum-based agents

 Carboplatin
 Cisplatin
 Dicycloplatin
 Oxaliplatin
 Nedaplatin
 Satraplatin

Retinoids
 Alitretinoin 
 Bexarotene
 Tretinoin

Vinca alkaloids and derivatives

 Vinblastine
 Vincristine
 Vindesine
 Vinorelbine

Full alphabetical listing

 Abraxane
 Actinomycin
 Alitretinoin
 All-trans retinoic acid
 Altretamine
 Azacitidine
 Azathioprine
 Belotecan
 Bendamustine
 Bexarotene
 Bleomycin
 Bortezomib
 Busulfan
 Cabazitaxel
 Camptothecin
 Carboplatin
 Carboquone
 Carmustine
 Capecitabine
 Cisplatin
 Chlorambucil
 Chlormethine
 Chlorozotocin
 Cyclophosphamide
 Cytarabine
 Dacarbazine
 Daunorubicin
 Docetaxel
 Doxifluridine
 Doxorubicin
 Epirubicin
 Epothilone
 Erlotinib
 Etoposide
 Exatecan
 Fluorouracil
 Fotemustine
 Gefitinib
 Gemcitabine
 Gimatecan
 Hydroxyurea
 Idarubicin
 Ifosfamide
 Imatinib
 Irinotecan
 Ixabepilone
 Larotaxel
 Lomustine
 Melphalan
 Melphalan flufenamide
 Mercaptopurine
 Methotrexate
 Mitobronitol
 Mitomycin C
 Mitoxantrone
 Nimustine
 Nitrosoureas
 Oxaliplatin
 Paclitaxel
 Pemetrexed
 Pipobroman
 Ranimustine
 Romidepsin
 Semustine
 Streptozotocin
 Tafluposide
 Taxotere
 Temozolomide
 Tesetaxel
 Teniposide
 Thiotepa
 Tioguanine
 Topotecan
 Treosulfan
 Tretinoin
 Triaziquone
 Triethylenemelamine
 Valrubicin
 Vemurafenib
 Vinblastine
 Vincristine
 Vindesine
 Vinorelbine
 Vismodegib
 Vorinostat

Comprehensive table

 

nl:Chemotherapie#Klassieke cytostatica